Melton-Davis House, also known as the Cannie Melton House, is a historic home located near Bostic, Rutherford County, North Carolina.  It was built about 1904, and is a one-story, weatherboarded, Queen Anne-style frame dwelling.  It sits on a concrete block foundation and consists of two main gable-front, double-pile blocks that flank the center hall, and its ornamental finish.  Also on the property is a contributing barn, built between about 1904 and 1915.

It was added to the National Register of Historic Places in 2008.

References

Houses on the National Register of Historic Places in North Carolina
Queen Anne architecture in North Carolina
Houses completed in 1904
Houses in Rutherford County, North Carolina
National Register of Historic Places in Rutherford County, North Carolina